Jorge Manuel Díaz (born June 8, 1966 in Santiago del Estero, Argentina) is a former Argentine footballer who played for clubs in Argentina, Chile, Mexico, Colombia, Venezuela and Austria.

Teams (Player)
  Rosario Central 1987-1989
  Strum Graz 1989-1990
  SKN St. Pölten 1990-1991
  Racing Club 1991
  Millonarios 1992
  Veracruz 1993
  O'Higgins 1994-1995
  Deportes Temuco 1996
  Deportes Puerto Montt 1997
  Deportivo Táchira 1998
  Coquimbo Unido 1999-2000
  O'Higgins 2001

Teams (Coach) 
  Coquimbo Unido 2006
  Rosario Central 2008
  Argentino de Rosario 2009–present

External links

 
 

1966 births
Living people
Argentine footballers
Argentine expatriate footballers
Argentine football managers
Coquimbo Unido managers
Rosario Central footballers
Racing Club de Avellaneda footballers
Millonarios F.C. players
Puerto Montt footballers
Coquimbo Unido footballers
O'Higgins F.C. footballers
Deportes Temuco footballers
Deportivo Táchira F.C. players
C.D. Veracruz footballers
Argentine Primera División players
Chilean Primera División players
Liga MX players
Austrian Football Bundesliga players
Categoría Primera A players
Venezuelan Primera División players
Expatriate footballers in Chile
Expatriate footballers in Mexico
Expatriate footballers in Austria
Expatriate footballers in Colombia
Expatriate footballers in Venezuela
Association football midfielders
People from Santiago del Estero
Sportspeople from Santiago del Estero Province